Motagua New Orleans is an American soccer club based in New Orleans, Louisiana that plays in the Gulf Coast Premier League.  The team was founded in 1984 and competes in both the ISLANO and Louisiana Premier League.

History
Motagua New Orleans was founded in 1984 by a collaboration of three family of brothers, the Serrano, Martinez and Diaz brothers. The team was managed by the Serrano brothers from 1984-1999 where they competed in the ISLANO and SELASA leagues in New Orleans. In 1999 current team manager and part owner, Mario "Tony" Martinez, gained rights as the sole owner of the team.

In 2010, Dr. John Hamide acquired part ownership of the team and formed an alliance between PDL team, Baton Rouge Capitals, which he also owned, and Motagua. Motagua New Orleans provided year-round high-level competition that allowed local Baton Rouge Capital players to stay fit for the PDL season.

In the most recent years Motagua has enjoyed success competing at both a regional and national level. They won the 2015 USASA Region III National Cup which qualified them for the 2015 USASA National Cup where they lost 1-0 to RWB Adria in the semifinals.

On February 3, 2016 Motagua New Orleans qualified for the 2016 Lamar Hunt U.S. Open Cup. Being the first amateur team from Louisiana to do so in the US Open Cup's current format.

Summaries
Team's performance at Gulf Coast Premier League.

Current roster
Roster submitted May 12, 2018 for the 2018 Gulf Coast Premier League

Notable former players
This list of notable former players comprises players who went on to play professional soccer after playing for the Motagua New Orleans, or those who previously played professionally before joining the team.
  Anthony Peters
  Víctor Ortiz
  Jaime Rosales
  Hendry Cordova
  Donaldo Morales
  Carlos Palacios

Honours
Gulf Coast Premier League: 2016-2017
ISLANO: 1994, 2004, 2013, 2014, 2015, 2016
Louisiana Premier League: 2014-2015, 2015-2016
USASA Region III National Cup: 2015, 2017
Lamar Hunt U.S. Open Cup: Competed in the 2016 Lamar Hunt U.S. Open Cup

External links
Official website

References

Soccer clubs in New Orleans
Association football clubs established in 1984
1984 establishments in Louisiana
Diaspora soccer clubs in the United States